Theodora Kantakouzene (died after 1381) was a Byzantine princess, the daughter of Emperor John VI Kantakouzenos and the fifth wife of the Ottoman Sultan Orhan Gazi.

Life 
Theodora was one of the three daughters of Emperor John VI Kantakouzenos by his wife Irene Asanina. The historian Nikephoros Gregoras erroneously calls her "Maria" in one passage. In January 1346, to cement her father's alliance with the rising Ottoman emirate and to prevent the Ottomans from giving their aid to the Empress-regent Anna of Savoy during the ongoing civil war, she was betrothed to the Ottoman ruler, Orhan Gazi. 

The marriage took place in the summer of the same year. Her parents and sisters escorted her to Selymbria, where Orhan's representatives, including grandees of his court and a cavalry regiment, arrived on a fleet of 30 ships. A ceremony was held at Selymbria, where Orhan's envoys received her and escorted her to the Ottoman lands in Bithynia, across the Marmara Sea, where the actual wedding took place.

Theodora remained a Christian after her marriage, and was active in supporting the Christians living under Ottoman rule. In 1347 she gave birth to her only son, Şehzade Halil, who was captured by Genoese pirates for ransom while still only a child. The Byzantine emperor John V Palaiologos was instrumental in his eventual release. Later, Halil married Irene, a daughter of John V Palaiologos and Theodora's sister, Helena Kantakouzene.

Except for a three-day sojourn in Constantinople in February 1347, in the aftermath of her father's victory in the civil war, Theodora remained at the Ottoman court until Orhan's death in 1362. After that, she apparently returned to Constantinople, where she lived with her sister, the Empress Helena, in the palace. She is last known to have been held imprisoned at Galata during the brief reign of Andronikos IV Palaiologos there in 1379–81.

Depictions in fiction

A fictionalised form of her character is the subject of Bertrice Small's novel Adora, published in 1980.

References

Sources 
 
 

1332 births
14th-century Byzantine women
14th-century consorts of Ottoman sultans
Theodora
Daughters of Byzantine emperors
Year of death unknown
Byzantine Empire–Ottoman Empire relations